Ben Wong Chi-yin (born 20 October 1967) is a Hong Kong actor best known for his roles as Yung Heung-hoi in the long-running drama series A Kindred Spirit and Spicy Ginger in the crime drama Lives of Omission, the latter garnering him Best Supporting Actor at the 2011 TVB Anniversary Awards. Wong was the hot favorite in winning this award and is proud of this achievement.

Filmography

Television dramas (TVB)

Television dramas (Shaw Brothers Studio)

Film

Dubbing 

 Dub of War's Second Season's Graduation Project- Spider-Man: No Way Home (2022)- Max Dillion/Electro

Hosting gigs
1989: 陽光節拍一小時
1991: Flash Fax (閃電傳真機)
1996: 北極追蹤
1997: 龍的光輝香港回歸大匯演
1997–1998: TVB Anniversary Gala (萬千星輝賀台慶)
1997–1998: Tung Wah Charity Show (歡樂滿東華)
1998: Hong Thai Travels: United States Special (康泰旅遊特輯《美國特輯》)
1998: Miss Hong Kong 1998
1999: Po Leung Kuk (星光熠熠耀保良)
1999: Hong Thai Travels: Spain Special (康泰旅遊特輯《西班牙特輯》)
1999: Hong Thai Travels: Portugal Special (康泰旅遊特輯《葡萄牙特輯》)
1999: 護苗基金慈善夜
1999: 活得精彩獻再生
2002: The 8th Annual Most Popular TV Commercial Award (第八屆十大電視廣告頒獎典禮)
2010: Enoch's Footptint: Greece (以諾遊蹤-希臘保羅疾風之旅)
2011: Enoch's Footprint: Israel (以諾遊蹤 - 以色列 穌哥行傳)
2011: World Heritage List: China Danxia (世界遺產名錄 飛越丹霞) (Episodes 1–3)

References

External links
Ben Wong at TVB.com

|-
! colspan="3" style="background: #DAA520;" | TVB Anniversary Awards
|-

1965 births
Living people
20th-century Hong Kong male actors
Hong Kong male television actors
Hong Kong male film actors
TVB actors
21st-century Hong Kong male actors